Red seabream is a name given to at least two species of fish of the family Sparidae, Pagrus major and Pagellus bogaraveo.

Pagrus major 

Pagrus major is of great culinary and cultural importance in Japan, and is known as madai in Japanese. It is considered an auspicious fish, eaten during Japanese New Year and other special occasions, such as weddings. It is also eaten in Taiwan and Korea, where it is known as chamdom.

Pagellus bogaraveo 

Pagellus bogaraveo is also known as blackspot sea bream. In Spain, the fish is known as besugo, and is often grilled over charcoal or wood fires.

External links
 Pagrus major (FishBase)
 Pagellus bogaraveo (FishBase)
 Tai: Japan's King of Fish (Kikkoman Food Forum)

Sparidae
Fish of Japan
Fish of East Asia
Fish common names